Events from the year 1844 in Ireland.

Events
29 March – official opening of the Dalkey Atmospheric Railway.
14 December – meeting to establish the first branch of the Society of Saint Vincent de Paul in Ireland chaired by Bartholomew Woodlock.
15 December – Saint Malachy's Church, Belfast is dedicated by Dr William Crolly, Archbishop of Armagh and Primate of All Ireland.
Dublin iron-founder Richard Turner begins assembling components for the Palm house at Kew Gardens in London, the first large-scale structural use of wrought iron.
Irish physician Francis Rynd utilises a hollow hypodermic needle to make the first recorded subcutaneous injections, specifically of a sedative to treat neuralgia.

Arts and literature
13 July – Thomas Davis's nationalist ballad A Nation Once Again is first published, in his newspaper The Nation.
Joseph Patrick Haverty paints Patrick O'Brien: The Limerick Piper and his brother Martin Haverty publishes Wanderings in Spain in 1843.
Charles Lever's novel Arthur O'Leary: His wanderings and ponderings in many lands is published in book form in London.

Births
3 February – James Henry Reynolds, recipient of the Victoria Cross for gallantry in 1879 at Rorke's Drift, South Africa (died 1932).
8 February – Joseph Ivess, member of the New Zealand House of Representatives (died 1919 in New Zealand).
20 February – James Rankin, lighthouse keeper in America (died 1921 in the United States).
12 March – Patrick Collins, U.S. Representative from Massachusetts and Mayor of Boston (died 1905 in the United States).
5 June – Thomas Cleeve, founder of Condensed Milk Company of Ireland, High Sheriff of Limerick (died 1908).
15 June – Charlotte Despard, suffragist, novelist and Sinn Féin activist (died 1939).
28 June – John Boyle O'Reilly, poet and novelist (died 1890).
7 July – George W. Joy, painter (died 1925).
1 August – Daniel John O'Donoghue, printer, labour leader and politician in Ontario (died 1907 in Canada).
9 August – John Sweetman, politician, one of founders of Sinn Féin and second President of the party in 1908 (died 1936).
6 November – Robert Browne, Roman Catholic Bishop of the Diocese of Cloyne (died 1935).
10 November – Dr. Mark F. Ryan, nationalist and author (died 1940).
21 November – William Martin Murphy, Nationalist (Irish Parliamentary Party) MP, newspaper proprietor, leader of employer's syndicate in the Dublin Lockout of 1913 (died 1919).
13 December – John Atkinson, Baron Atkinson, politician and judge, Attorney-General for Ireland and Law Lord (died 1932).
Full date unknown – James McParland, Pinkerton detective agent (died 1919 in the United States).

Deaths
8 January – William Warren Baldwin, doctor, businessman, lawyer, judge, architect and political figure in Upper Canada (born 1775).
10 January – Hudson Lowe, British military leader (born 1769).
13 January – Alexander Porter, United States Senator for Louisiana (born 1785).
20 February – Edward Kernan, Bishop of Clogher, 1824–1844 (born 1771).
26 August – John Keane, 1st Baron Keane, British Army Lieutenant-General (born 1781).
29 August – Edmund Ignatius Rice, Roman Catholic missionary and educationalist, founder of the Congregation of Christian Brothers and the Presentation Brothers (born 1762).

References

 
Years of the 19th century in Ireland
1840s in Ireland
Ireland
 Ireland